The Siemens Charger is a family of diesel-electric passenger locomotives designed and manufactured by Siemens Mobility for the North American market.

There are five variants of the Charger, tailored for different operators and types of service: ALC-42 for Amtrak long-distance service, ALC-42E dual mode for Amtrak inter-city and long-distance routes that serve the Northeast Corridor, SC-44 for Amtrak state-supported inter-city service or commuter rail operators, SCB-40 for Brightline inter-city service and SCV-42 for VIA Rail inter-city service.

The first production Charger, a SC-44, was unveiled on March 26, 2016, and entered revenue service on August 24, 2017. It was followed by the SCB-40, which inaugurated Brightline service on January 13, 2018. The first ALC-42 was delivered to Amtrak on June 17, 2021 and entered revenue service on February 8, 2022 on the Empire Builder.

The Charger is often paired with Venture passenger cars, also built by Siemens, as part of a trainset.

Design 
The Charger is powered by a Cummins 16-cylinder QSK95 4-stroke high speed diesel engine, which meets United States Environmental Protection Agency's more stringent Tier 4 emissions standards that took effect in 2015. Power output varies by model: the SCB-40 produces , the SC-44 produces , and both the SCV-42 and ALC-42 produce .

The locomotive shares much of its overall design with the Siemens Vectron diesel and electric locomotives used in Europe and the Siemens ACS-64 electric locomotive built for Amtrak.

Four Insulated-gate bipolar transistor (IGBT) power inverters carry electric current to each of the four AC traction motors. A static inverter off of the main prime mover supplies head-end power (HEP). The locomotive also features dynamic braking with regenerative capability, allowing the locomotive to divert power generated by dynamic braking away from the resistor grids to HEP and onboard locomotive auxiliary power demands.

In response to a 2013 Request for Information from Metro-North Railroad, Siemens said they would be capable of producing a dual-mode variant of the Charger with onboard energy storage for use by Metro-North and the Long Island Rail Road, as well as intercity service on Amtrak's Empire Corridor.

California's SC-44s have aerodynamic "spoilers" on the rear of their roofs that match the height of bi-level California and Surfliner cars.

The Charger series competes with other Tier 4 compliant locomotives, such as the EMD F125 and the MPI MPXpress MP54AC. However, unlike the Charger series, both the F125 and MP54AC have struggled to find customers, selling fewer than 50 units each.

Service history 

The first production SC-44 unit was unveiled on March 26, 2016. The first two Charger locomotives to leave Siemens' factory in Florin, California were transported to the Transportation Technology Center (TTC) in Pueblo, Colorado in June 2016 and underwent testing of performance metrics such as acceleration and braking. The first Brightline SCB-40 locomotives were delivered in December 2016 to undergo testing in Florida.

In February 2017, Amtrak and the Washington State Department of Transportation began testing one of the Midwest-bound locomotives along the Cascades corridor in the Pacific Northwest for federal certification. Additional test runs were conducted on the Midwest and Northern California routes in April and May.

Revenue testing on the Capitol Corridor and San Joaquins routes in Northern California began on May 25, 2017. During these tests, the trains operated with a second locomotive in case of failure. The Northern California units were formally accepted and approved for solo service on October 23, 2017. The SC-44 entered revenue testing on the Midwest routes in July 2017, with solo revenue service beginning on a Hiawatha Service train on August 24, 2017. Revenue service on the Cascades route began in November 2017.

On December 18, 2017, Washington state SC-44 #1402 was wrecked in a derailment of a Cascades train on the Point Defiance Bypass.

Brightline began revenue operations with its SCB-40 locomotives on January 13, 2018. The first Chargers for MARC began testing that month, and revenue service began on April 5, 2018. Pre-revenue testing began on the Pacific Surfliner in October 2018; revenue service began later that year.

The first ALC-42 for Amtrak's long distance trains was put into service on the westbound Empire Builder on February 8, 2022 after extensive testing in the Midwest and on the Empire Builder route. Of the 2 units on the inaugural service, one was Amtrak's "Day One" heritage unit #301.

Customers

Altamont Corridor Express 
California regional commuter line Altamont Corridor Express ordered four SC-44 locomotives in April 2018, with deliveries beginning in December 2019. They entered revenue service in 2020.

Amtrak

National Network
On December 21, 2018, Amtrak ordered 75 ALC-42 locomotives with options for additional 100. The first locomotive entered service in February 2022 with the last expected by 2024.

Assembly of the first ALC-42 began in March 2020. On August 5, 2020, Amtrak announced that one of the first six locomotives will be painted in a replica of the "Day 1" livery to commemorate 50 years of Amtrak service, while the other five will feature a preliminary "Phase VI" paint scheme. The remainder of the fleet will introduce a new "Phase VII" livery. By February 2021, 12 units had begun production, with the first locomotive, AMTK 300, delivered to Amtrak on June 17. The first ALC-42 locomotives entered revenue service on the Empire Builder on February 8, 2022. On the same day, Amtrak announced that they had ordered an additional 50 ALC-42s, bringing the total number of locomotives ordered to 125.

Northeast Corridor 

Amtrak plans to purchase at least 65 intercity trainsets with dual-mode ALC-42E locomotives from Siemens. The trainsets will be used primarily on routes that operate over both electrified and non-electrified track, which currently require costly and lengthy locomotive swaps when transitioning between electrified and non-electrified territory.

In diesel mode, the ALC-42E will work like a typical diesel–electric locomotive, using its diesel engine to generate electricity for its motors. Each ALC-42E will be paired with a special trailer car that will have equipment to support electric mode on the end closest to the locomotive, and a passenger seating area on the other. There are two types of trailer cars:
 An Auxiliary Power Vehicle (APV) will be used on trains that use track with overhead lines. Equipped with a pantograph and transformers, the APV will supply electricity to the ALC-42E as well as additional motors on its own powered truck. The ALC-42E/APV pairing will replace Amtrak's existing Siemens ACS-64 electric locomotives on trains that use the Northeast Corridor for part of their route.
 A battery car will be used on trains that access New York Penn Station via the Empire Connection, which has a third rail instead of overhead lines. The battery car will supply electricity to the ALC-42E in areas where diesel engine use is prohibited. The ALC-42E/battery car pairing will replace Amtrak's existing GE Genesis P32AC-DM dual mode locomotives, which draw electricity from the third rail in electric mode.

State-supported corridors 

The Illinois Department of Transportation (IDOT), in conjunction with its counterparts in California, Michigan, Missouri and Washington, purchased 32 SC-44 locomotives for state-supported corridor services, operated by Amtrak under contract.

The $225 million order placed in March 2014 included options for an additional 75 corridor-configured locomotives In 2015, IDOT ordered 12 additional units for use on the upgraded Lincoln Service corridor. California ordered 14 additional units in November 2015 for use on the Pacific Surfliner beginning in 2018, plus two more units in 2016 for the Northern California services. Washington state ordered an additional unit to replace the one lost in the 2017 Washington train derailment and two more in connection with its purchase of new Siemens trainsets.

A total of 66 locomotives (32 base and 34 options) were ordered for Amtrak state corridors in this contract: 22 for California, 11 for Washington state, and 33 for the Midwest states. Another 8 options were exercised by MARC, bringing total contract orders to 74.

Brightline 

In September 2014, Brightline purchased ten SCB-40 locomotives with options for an additional eleven. The locomotives are used in pairs, bookending four passenger cars (expandable to seven) on Brightline's Miami–West Palm Beach service. Brightline later ordered five additional trainsets and one extra locomotive (eleven locomotives total) for use on the extension to Orlando, with delivery between September 2021 and 2023. These locomotives have been able to reach speeds of up to 130 mph. As of February 19, 2023, all trainsets and the spare locomotive have been delivered to Brightline.

Coaster 

In June 2018, the North County Transit District Board of Directors approved the purchase of five SC-44s for its San Diego-area Coaster commuter rail service, replacing five older F40PH locomotives. Deliveries began in August 2020 and are expected to conclude in the spring of 2021. Two additional units were approved in June 2019, and another two in September. These additional locomotives will replace two existing F59PHI locomotives and allow increased service levels. The first five locomotives entered revenue service on February 8, 2021.

Exo 
In January 2022, Montreal's Exo ordered 10 Siemens Chargers to update the fleet. They are planned to replace the aging F59PH locomotives.

MARC 
MARC announced in August 2015 that it was seeking $58 million to purchase eight locomotives to replace their aging electric powered AEM-7 units, with deliveries planned for late 2017. The purchase was approved by the Maryland Board of Public Works on September 16, 2015. The MARC order uses part of the Amtrak state-corridor options. The first MARC Charger was shipped from the Siemens factory in early December 2017, and began testing in mid-January 2018.

Metro-North Railroad (New York) 
In December 2020, New York's Metropolitan Transportation Authority  approved a Federal Transit Administration-funded $335 million contract for 27 dual-mode locomotives based on the Charger design. The new locomotives will replace the 27 existing GE Genesis locomotives used on the Metro-North Railroad's Hudson Line, Harlem Line, and Danbury Branch; they will use third rail electric power to enter Grand Central Terminal. The first 19 locomotives are scheduled to be completed in mid-2026. The contract has options for 144 additional locomotives: 32 for Metro-North, 66 for the Long Island Rail Road, 20 for the New York State Department of Transportation (for Amtrak Empire Service trains), and 25 for the Connecticut Department of Transportation.

Ontario Northland 
In December 2022, the Government of Ontario and Ontario Northland  announced a  investment to reinstate the Northlander passenger service between Timmins and Toronto. The government news release mentioned that the three new trainsets will be built by Siemens Mobility and paired wih Charger locomotives that will meet the latest EPA Tier 4 diesel emission standards.

Via Rail 

In December 2018, Via Rail ordered 32 bi-directional trainsets each powered by one SC-44 locomotive for use on the Québec City–Windsor Corridor. The first of VIA Rail's trainsets were delivered on September 29, 2021 to VIA Rail in Montreal, crossing into Canada via Sarnia, Ontario. When the locomotives' final paint scheme was unveiled by VIA Rail in May 2021, the locomotive was designated as an SC-44, but when delivered the locomotives' designation had been changed to SCV-42.

See also 
 EMD F125 – competing Tier 4 passenger locomotive
 MPI MPXpress MP54AC – competing Tier 4 passenger locomotive

References

Further reading

External links 

 Raw Footage of Siemens Charger SC-44 4601 Cummins QSK95 Testing (YouTube)

Siemens locomotives
Bo-Bo locomotives
Passenger locomotives
Diesel-electric locomotives of the United States
Railway locomotives introduced in 2014
EPA Tier 4-compliant locomotives of the United States
Standard gauge locomotives of the United States
Diesel-electric locomotives of Canada